"There's a Kind of Hush" is a popular song written by Les Reed and Geoff Stephens. Originally recorded by Stephens' group the New Vaudeville Band in 1967 as a neo-British music hall number, this version of the track became a hit in Australia and South Africa. However, in the rest of the world, a near-simultaneous cover was a big hit for Herman's Hermits.  The song was a charted hit again in 1976 for The Carpenters.

First recordings
The song was introduced on the 1966 album Winchester Cathedral by Geoff Stephens' group the New Vaudeville Band; like that group's hit "Winchester Cathedral", "There's a Kind of Hush" was conceived as a neo-British music hall number although it is a less overt example of that style. The first single version of "There's a Kind of Hush" was recorded in 1966 by Gary and the Hornets, a teen/pre-teen male band from Franklin, Ohio whose version—entitled "Kind of Hush" produced by Lou Reizner—became a regional success and showed signs of breaking nationally in January 1967; the single would reach No. 4 in Cincinnati and No. 3 in Erie PA. However an expedient cover by Herman's Hermits was released in the US in January 1967 to reach the Top 30 of the Billboard Hot 100 in three weeks and proceeded to a peak of #4—affording the group their final US Top Ten hit—with Gold certification for US sales of one million units awarded that April.  The record notched two positions higher on the Silver Dollar Survey for 3–10 March 1967 on WLS, for an overall rank of #26 for 1967, and topped the Boss 30 for 8–22 March 1967 on KHJ.  In the UK Herman's Hermits' "There's a Kind of Hush" would reach No. 7. The success of the Herman's Hermits version led to the release of the original New Vaudeville Band track as a single in some territories with both of these versions charting in Australia with peaks of No. 5 (Herman's Hermits) and No. 12 (New Vaudeville Band) and also in South Africa where the New Vaudeville Band bested the Herman's Hermits' No. 9 peak by reaching No. 4.

Chart performance

Weekly charts

Year-end charts

Carpenters version

The Carpenters remade "There's a Kind of Hush"—as "There's a Kind of Hush (All Over the World)"—for their 1976 album release A Kind of Hush for which it served as lead single, reaching No. 12 on the Billboard Hot 100 chart and affording the Carpenters' their thirteenth No. 1 on the easy listening chart.

The Carpenters' version has a notable country pop feel, but was not particularly successful for their usual standard in that time. In fact, the single's lack of comparative success indicated a drop in the Carpenters' popularity, it being the first lead single from a mainstream Carpenters' album to fall short of the Top 5 since "Ticket to Ride" from the group's 1969 debut album Offering, while the No. 33 chart peak of the A Kind of Hush album afforded the Carpenters' their first Top 20 shortfall since Offering (Horizon would prove to be their last album to reach the top 20 in the United States). "There's a Kind of Hush" would remain the Carpenters' final top twenty hit until 1981's "Touch Me When We're Dancing".

Richard Carpenter explained in the liner notes to the Carpenters' 2004 best-of compilation, Gold, that although he and Karen loved the song, he was not particularly pleased with how their remake turned out:

Chart performance

Weekly charts

Year-end charts

Personnel
Karen Carpenter – lead vocals and backing vocals
Richard Carpenter – backing vocals, Wurlitzer electronic piano, Fender Rhodes electric piano, ARP Odyssey, orchestration
Joe Osborn – bass guitar
Tony Peluso – guitar
Jim Gordon – drums
Bob Messenger – tenor saxophone
Lenny Castro – percussion

See also
List of number-one adult contemporary singles of 1976 (U.S.)

References

External links
 
 

1966 songs
1967 singles
1976 singles
Songs written by Les Reed (songwriter)
Songs written by Geoff Stephens
Herman's Hermits songs
The Carpenters songs
Four Jacks and a Jill songs
Song recordings produced by Mickie Most
A&M Records singles
Columbia Graphophone Company singles
MGM Records singles
Fontana Records singles
Philips Records singles